Mirush (Blodsbånd) is a Norwegian movie from 2007 directed by Marius Holst. It tells the story of an Albanian boy, Mirush, who travels to Norway in search of his father. 
Italian actor Enrico Lo Verso plays the role of Bekim, Mirush's father.

Plot 
Mirush leaves Kosovo hoping to find his father in Norway, who abandoned the family when Mirush was very young. Now the father runs a restaurant in Oslo, but he is also in deep debt to the Albanian Mafia. Mirush starts to work in his father's restaurant without letting him know that he is his son.

Cast
Enrico Lo Verso ... Bekim (The Father)
Nazif Muarremi ... Mirush

External links 

 Marius Holst´s Statement about Mirush

2007 films
2007 drama films
Norwegian crime drama films
Albanian-language films
Norwegian-language films
Films directed by Marius Holst
Films set in Oslo